The 2017 Volta a Portugal was a men's road bicycle race held from 4 August to 15 August 2017. It is the 79th edition of the men's stage race to be held, which was established in 1927. As part of the 2017 UCI Europe Tour, it was rated as a 2.1 event.
Raúl Alarcón end the race in first place. However, in March 2021, due to doping all his results obtained between 28 July 2015 and 21 October 2019 were cancelled, including 2017 Volta a Portugal.

Participating teams
In total, 18 teams are set to compete.

National teams:

International teams:

Schedule

Classification leadership

Classification standings

Prologue
4 August 2017 — Lisbon, 5.4 km individual time trial (ITT)

Prologue result and general classification

Stage 1
5 August 2017 — Vila Franca de Xira to Setubal, 203 km

Stage 2
6 August 2017 — Reguengos de Monsaraz to Castelo Branco, 214.7 km

Stage 3
7 August 2017 — Figueira de Castelo Rodrigo to Bragança, 162.7 km

Stage 4
8 August 2017 — Macedo de Cavaleiros to Mondim de Basto (Srª da Graça), 152.7 km

Stage 5
9 August 2017 — Boticas to Viana do Castelo, 179.6 km

Stage 6
10 August 2017 — Braga to Fafe, 182.7 km

Stage 7
12 August 2017 — Lousada to Santo Tirso (Santuário N. Sra. Assunção), 161.9 km

Stage 8
13 August 2017 — Gondomar to Oliveira de Azeméis, 159.8 km

Stage 9
14 August 2017 — Lousã to Guarda, 184.1 km

Stage 10
15 August 2017 — Viseu to Viseu, 20.1 km

References

External links

2017
Volta a Portugal
Volta a Portugal